Éva Bisséni (born 7 February 1981 in Bayonne, France) is a French judoka and ju-jitsuka.

Achievements

External links
 

1981 births
Living people
French female judoka
Judoka at the 2004 Summer Olympics
Olympic judoka of France
21st-century French women